Antilurga is a genus of moths in the family Geometridae.

Species
 Antilurga alhambrata (Staudinger, 1859)
 Antilurga altatlas
 Antilurga reductaria

References
 Antilurga at Markku Savela's Lepidoptera and Some Other Life Forms

Larentiini
Geometridae genera